Marian Wiesław Ostafiński (born 8 December 1946 in Przemyśl) is a Polish former footballer who played as a defender.

At international level he made 11 appearances for the Poland national team and was a participant at the 1972 Summer Olympics, where his team won the gold medal.

References

External links 
  Polish Olympic Committee website

Living people
1946 births
People from Przemyśl
Sportspeople from Podkarpackie Voivodeship
Polish footballers
Association football defenders
Poland international footballers
Footballers at the 1972 Summer Olympics
Olympic gold medalists for Poland
Olympic footballers of Poland
Stal Rzeszów players
Ruch Chorzów players
Polonia Bytom players
Olympic medalists in football
Medalists at the 1972 Summer Olympics
Stal Stalowa Wola players
SC Hazebrouck players